Charles John Macallum, known as Rabbit Mac, is a Hip Hop and Rap based Indian singer from Malaysia who is active in the Malaysian musical industry. He is also popular in other Asian regions namely India, Singapore, Sri Lanka and also in Canada. Rabbit Mac has thus far created 3 albums and have collaborated with other artists for over 50 albums. Rabbit, who is also into hip-hop Malaysian Tamil Underground music, started his professional music career by making remixes of both English and Tamil songs.

Discography 
At the beginning of his career and due to his passion for music and curiosity, Rabbit was noticed by some of the leading pubs and bistros as an Emcee and DJ, getting hired to participate in special shows, Hip Hop shows and Gigs in Penang. The first studio album he collaborated in, was produced in 2005, together with Mista West and D.J.Bluezi. Recently he debuted in a movie called Maindhan which was launched on 7 August 2014 that happen to be Malaysia's most expensive Tamil movie with his label mate Sheezay.

Besides his already mentioned success, Rabbit Mac has also featured and worked alongside artists like Bionic Asura, Dhilip Varman, Mista Gee, Mc Phoenix, SatishDPaul, Haze Freaky G, Saran Z, Sugu Amigoz, Mc.Syze, Lock Up, Vassan, Sasi the Don, Nakeeran from Malaysia, Shabir from Singapore, Dinesh Kanagarathnam from Sri Lanka, DJ.Sathya, Christopher Columbus from Singapore, Srik from India, and Charles Bosco from United Kingdoms. He featured and composed a sound track for India's Jaya TV's “Thuppariyum Pulli”. PSYCHO.unit and Rabbit Mac have also worked with a big time movie making company known as MIG Metrowealth by doing sound tracks for most anticipated local movies “Senario” and “Ngangkong” which were released end of the year 2009.

Albums

Playback Singing

References

External links 
 https://hivadotcom.wordpress.com/rabbit-mac-malaysia/

1983 births
Malaysian businesspeople
Malaysian rappers
Malaysian hip hop singers
Malaysian male singer-songwriters
Malaysian singer-songwriters
Malaysian people of Indian descent
People from Penang
Living people
Malaysian rhythm and blues singers